Kruchinino is a rural locality (a village) in Nikolayevsky Selsoviet, Ufimsky District, Bashkortostan, Russia. The population was 10 as of 2010. There are 5 streets.

Geography 
Kruchinino is located 32 km northwest of Ufa (the district's administrative centre) by road. Kolokoltsevo is the nearest rural locality.

References 

Rural localities in Ufimsky District